If You're Ever Down In Texas, Look Me Up is an American folk song written by Terry Shand and "By" Dunham, and first released in the 1940s.

The lyrics of the song tell of a traveler from Texas singing about the vast wealth and natural beauty of his home, inviting the audience to "look me up" during their next visit to Texas.

Lyrics

If you're ever down in Texas look me up
Look us up!
If you're ever down in Texas look me up
Drop around!
Where the men are men and love it,
And the girls are sure glad of it,
If you're ever down in Texas look me up

Everybody's gonna holler, Howdy doody!
Howdy doody!
Everybody there's gonna ask, how are you?
How ya all?
We raise corn for hot tamales,
And grow dollies for the follies,
If you're ever down in Texas look me up

Ask anyone there for Rusty,
Everyone there knows me,
They'll tell you where I'm ridin' for,
If A, B, C, or D

If you're ever down in Texas look me up
Come on down!
We've got everything in Texas lookin' up
Lookin' fine!
Am I right or Am-I-rilla?
Man, this state's a killa dilla
If you're ever down in Texas look me up

My little partner Dusty,
Always rides the range with me,
His smile is as homey,
As a Texas melodee

If you're ever down in Texas look me up
Hiya All!
We've got everything in Texas lookin' up
Oh ya!
Bronco Bustin' takes some practice,
Or you'll end up on a cactus,
If you're ever down in Texas look me up

In other media 
In 1950, Phil Harris recorded this song for the Tom and Jerry short Texas Tom, in which Tom lip-synchs the song to a female cat, only to be exposed when Jerry alters the speeds on the hidden record player.

American songs
Songs about Texas